And Women Shall Weep is a 1960 British drama film directed by John Lemont and starring Ruth Dunning, Max Butterfield and Richard O'Sullivan. Its plot is about a mother who tries to prevent her younger son being led astray by his delinquent elder brother.
The title is taken from Charles Kingsley's 1851 poem, Three Fishers.

Cast
 Ruth Dunning – Mrs Lumsden 
 Max Butterfield – Terry Lumsden 
 Richard O'Sullivan – Godfrey Lumsden 
 Gillian Vaughan – Brenda Wilkes 
 Claire Gordon – Sadie MacDougall 
 David Gregory – Desmond Peel 
 David Rose – Woody Forrest 
 León García – Ossie Green
 Prudence Bury - Jenny Owens

References

External links
 

1960 films
Films directed by John Lemont
1960 drama films
British drama films
1960s English-language films
1960s British films